Blur: The Best Of is a greatest hits compilation album by English Britpop band Blur, first released in late 2000 and is the final Blur album by Food Records. It was released on CD, cassette tape, MiniDisc, double 12" vinyl record, DVD and VHS. The CD album includes 17 of Blur's 23 singles from 1990 to 2000, plus non-single, "This Is a Low". A special edition of the CD version included a live CD. The DVD/VHS version contains the videos of Blur's first 22 singles. The album, which has had enduring sales, hit number 3 in the band's native UK in the autumn of 2000, while denting the US charts at number 186. The cover is by artist Julian Opie. The painting of this Blur album can be found at the National Portrait Gallery in London, England.

The album received a positive critical response. Of the reviews collected from notable publications by popular review aggregator website Metacritic, the album holds an overall approval rating of 88%.

On the chart ending 7 March 2009, it was reported by Music Week that the album passed over one million unit sales in the United Kingdom.

A proposed title for the album was Best Blur Album in the World Ever, in reference to the compilation album series The Best... Album in the World...Ever! (which often contained songs by Blur).

Track listing

Disc one
All tracks written by Damon Albarn, Graham Coxon, Alex James, and Dave Rowntree.

Disc two (Limited Edition) 
Recorded live at Wembley Arena, 11 December 1999.
 "She's So High" – 5:24
 "Girls & Boys" – 4:21
 "To the End" – 4:08
 "End of a Century" – 3:00
 "Stereotypes" – 3:27
 "Charmless Man" – 3:31
 "Beetlebum" – 6:09
 "M.O.R." – 3:09
 "Tender" – 6:20
 "No Distance Left to Run" – 4:09

VHS/DVD
 "She's So High"
 "There's No Other Way"
 "Bang"
 "Popscene"
 "For Tomorrow"
 "Chemical World"
 "Sunday Sunday"
 "Girls & Boys"
 "Parklife"
 "To the End"
 "End of a Century"
 "Country House"
 "The Universal"
 "Stereotypes"
 "Charmless Man"
 "Beetlebum"
 "Song 2"
 "On Your Own"
 "M.O.R."
 "Tender"
 "Coffee & TV"
 "No Distance Left to Run"

Both the CDs and the DVD were released together as a box set in the United States in November 2007, but this release has since been removed from distribution.

Personnel 

Blur
 Damon Albarn – lead vocals, keyboards, synthesizers, organs, acoustic guitar, backing vocals on "Coffee and TV" and "Tender", xylophone on "To the End"
 Graham Coxon – electric and acoustic guitars, backing vocals, lead vocals on "Coffee and TV" and parts of "Tender", saxophone on "Parklife" and "Country House", clarinet on "End of a Century" and "To the End", drums on "Song 2"
 Alex James – bass guitar, backing vocals
 Dave Rowntree – drums, percussion, backing vocals, drum machine on "Girls & Boys" and "On Your Own"

Additional personnel
 Blur – production
 Jack Clark – mixing
 Al Clay – mixing
 Jason Cox – engineering
 Tom Girling – assistant producer
 Stephen Hague – producer, engineer
 Ben Hillier – producer, mixing
 Jeff Knowler – assistant engineer
 Damian LeGassick – programming
 Steve Lovell – producer
 Gerard Navarro – assistant engineer
 William Orbit – producer, engineer
 Jeremy Plumb – art direction, design
 Steve Power – producer
 Iain Roberton – assistant engineer
 Andy Ross – engineer
 John Smith – producer, engineer
 Sean Spuehler – programming
 Stephen Street – producer, engineer
 Greg Williams – photography

Charts and certifications

Weekly charts

Certifications

References

External links

Blur: The Best Of at YouTube (streamed copy where licensed)

2000 greatest hits albums
Blur (band) albums
Albums produced by Stephen Street
Albums produced by William Orbit
Parlophone compilation albums